Tardajos is a municipality and town located in the province of Burgos, Castile and León, Spain. According to the 2014 census (INE), the municipality has a population of 950 inhabitants.

History

Tardajos received a fuero from Count Pedro González de Lara and Countess Eva in 1127. It was re-issued with adjustments on three subsequent occasions by either Pedro or Eva, the last being in 1147.

Notes

Municipalities in the Province of Burgos